Diamondback may refer to:

Animals
 Crotalus adamanteus, the eastern diamondback rattlesnake
 Crotalus atrox, the western diamondback rattlesnake
 Diamondback moth, a European moth that has spread to North America
 Diamondback terrapin, a turtle, the state reptile of Maryland
 Diamondback water snake, a common species of water snake in North America

Arts and media
Diamondback (Willis Stryker), a supervillain and arch-enemy of Luke Cage
Diamondback (Rachel Leighton), a supervillain turned superhero and supporting character of Captain America
Diamondback (game), a fictional card game from the Cerebus comics
 The Diamondback, the official student newspaper of the University of Maryland, College Park

Organizations
 Arizona Diamondbacks, a Major League Baseball team since 1998
 Chandler Diamondbacks, an Arizona Fall League baseball team that operated during 1992–1994
 Diamondback Bicycles, American bicycle maker
 VFA-102 Diamondbacks, a U.S. Navy strike fighter squadron

Technology
 Diamondback (missile), a U.S. Navy missile concept of the 1950s
 Colt Diamondback, a double-action revolver
 Diamondback, a computer mouse created by Razer USA Ltd

Other uses
Diamond Back (Frontier City), a roller coaster at Frontier City in Oklahoma City, Oklahoma
Diamondback (Kings Island), a roller coaster at Kings Island in Mason, Ohio

See also
"Diamond in the Back", a 2004 single by rapper Ludacris

Animal common name disambiguation pages